Finlay Joseph Bean  (born 16 April 2002) is an English cricketer who plays for Yorkshire County Cricket Club. He is a left-handed batsman and wicket-keeper.

Personal life
Bean was educated at Queen Ethelburga's College, York.

Career
In June 2022, Bean scored a record 441 runs for Yorkshire second-XI against Nottinghamshire, it was the highest score ever scored in the Second-XI Championship beating the 322 scored by  Marcus Trescothick for Somerset against Warwickshire at Taunton in 1997. Following this score Bean was given a contract with Yorkshire until the end of the 2023 season. He scored 61 on his List-A debut for Yorkshire against Kent in the Royal London Cup on 19 August 2022. Bean made his first-class debut for Yorkshire on 5 September 2022 against Lancashire County Cricket Club at Old Trafford. He was praised for the assertiveness of his defensive shots as well as the fluidity of his attacking shots.

References

External Links

2002 births
English cricketers
Yorkshire cricketers
Living people
Cricketers from Harrogate